Milburn is a male given name which may refer to:

People:
Milburn Akers (1900-1970), American newspaper journalist and editor
Milburn G. Apt (1924-1956), United States Air Force test pilot, the first person to reach the speed of Mach 3
Milburn E. Calhoun (1930-2012), American physician, philanthropist and book publisher
Milburn Russell Tiny Croft (1920-1977), American National Football League player
Milburn Price (born 1938), American hymn composer and academic
Milt Shoffner (1905-1978), American Major League Baseball pitcher
Milburn Smith (1912-1994), American college and high school football and basketball coach
Milburn Stone (1904-1980), American actor best known for playing Doc in the TV series Gunsmoke

Fictional characters:
Rich Uncle Pennybags, mascot of the game Monopoly
Milburn Drysdale, a banker in the TV series The Beverly Hillbillies

Masculine given names